Mesnil-Verclives is a commune in the Eure department in Normandy in northern France.

Etymology
Old North French Mesnil 'house' and Verclives (Warcliva 11th century) Old English clif or Old Norse klif. Verclives is located on a small hill. The first element could be Old English . In French intervocalic consonants weakened and erased.

Old English clif or Old Norse klif can be found in several place-names of Normandy such as Witeclive 'white cliff' former hamlet near Evreux;  Carquelif (Caleclif 1224 in Saint-Martin-en-Campagne); Risleclif former hamlet near Saint-Samson-de-la-Roque; Mont Escalleclif (12th century, Doville); Mont Entenclin (Mont Estenclif 'stone cliff')...

The hill was used as an observation post at the battle of Brémule.

Population

See also
Communes of the Eure department

References

Communes of Eure